The Poorvi Star is a service medal given to Indian military personnel who served in Bangladesh during the Indo-Pakistani War of 1971.

References

Military awards and decorations of India